The 1961 USAC Road Racing Championship season was the fourth season of the USAC Road Racing Championship.  It began June 25, 1961, and ended October 22, 1961, after four races.  Ken Miles won the season championship.

Calendar

Season results

External links
World Sports Racing Prototypes: 1961 USAC Road Racing Championship
Racing Sports Cars: USAC Road Racing Championship archive
USAC Road Racing Championship
Usac Road Racing
1961 in American motorsport